Heimerzheim is the largest local part of the municipality Swisttal in the North-Rhine/Westphalian (North Rhine Westphalia) Rhein-Sieg district. It is situated approximately 20 km west of Bonn. In 2015 the local part had 6,199 inhabitants.

History 

Heimerzheim was mentioned for the first time documentary in the year 1074, its goods and land belonged to the St. Kunibert abbey in Cologne.

Buildings and culture 

The place has two castles, in the north Kriegshoven Castle and in the south Heimerzheim Castle; both are in noble family estate. Heimerzheim has two schools and an active association life; one of the village highlights is annual the contactor celebration on the first weekend in July. The branch office FH federation (specialist area public security) Heimerzheim serves among other things the Federal Intelligence Service (Bundesnachrichtendienst), the Federal Criminal Police Office (Germany) (Bundeskriminalamt) as well as the Federal Office for the Protection of the Constitution (Verfassungsschutz) as training centre. It is placed there in the range resident of the German Federal Police (Bundespolizei).

Famous people connected with Heimerzheim 
 Freiherr Philipp von Boeselager, Officer of the Wehrmacht, member of the 20 July Plot
 Freiherr Georg von Boeselager, Officer of the Wehrmacht, member of the 20 July Plot

Notes

External links 
 Website of the municipality Swisttal 

Towns in North Rhine-Westphalia